Leucine-rich repeat-containing protein 8C is a protein that in humans is encoded by the LRRC8C gene. Researchers have found out that this protein, along with the other LRRC8 proteins LRRC8A, LRRC8B, LRRC8D, and LRRC8E, is sometimes a subunit of the heteromer protein Volume-Regulated Anion Channel. Volume-Regulated Anion Channels (VRACs) are crucial to the regulation of cell size by transporting chloride ions and various organic osmolytes, such as taurine or glutamate, across the plasma membrane, and that is not the only function these channels have been linked to.

While LRRC8C is one of many proteins that can be part of VRAC, research has found that it is not as crucial to the activity of the channel in comparison to LRRC8A and LRRC8D. However, while we know that LRRC8A and LRRC8D are necessary for VRAC function, other studies have found that they are not sufficient for the full range of usual VRAC activity. This is where the other LRRC8 proteins come in, such as LRRC8C, as the different composition of these subunits affects the range of specificity for VRACs.

In addition to its role in VRACs, the LRRC8 protein family is also associated with agammaglobulinemia-5.

References

Further reading

Human proteins